Mithrax is a genus of spider crabs in the family Mithracidae, containing about a dozen species that exhibit wide variation in body morphology.

References

Majoidea
Decapod genera